Victor Vasilevich Sidoruk (Cyrillic:Виктор Васильевич Сидорук; born 4 September 1937 in Lviv, Ukraine SSR, USSR) is a Ukrainian archer who represented the Soviet Union.

Sidoruk won the inaugural USSR national championships in Tallinn in 1963, before going on to represent the USSR at the 1972 Olympics, where he finished 7th. The next year, he became World Champion at the 1973 World Archery Championships in Grenoble.

In 1976 he returned to the Olympics as coach to the USSR team. He also coached the surprise gold medal winning Spanish team at the 1992 Olympics, and as of 2013 is the head national coach of Ukraine.

References

1937 births
Living people
Ukrainian male archers
Olympic archers of the Soviet Union
Archers at the 1972 Summer Olympics
World Archery Championships medalists
Sportspeople from Lviv